The fixture list for the 2023 Women's Super League were announced on 9 January 2023, with the opening fixture featuring defending champions Leeds playing York in a rematch of the 2022 grand final

Each team will play ten fixtures during the regular seasom, spread over 11 weekends.  Play-off fixtures will follow the regular season.

Regular season

All times are UK local time (UTC+01:00)

Round 1

Round 2

Round 3

Round 4

Round 5

Round 6

Round 7

Round 8

Round 9

Round 10

Round 11

References

RFL Women's Super League
2023 in English rugby league
2023 in English women's sport
2023 in women's rugby league